Kapros is a town of ancient Greece.

Kapros may also refer to:
Anikó Kapros (born 1983), Hungarian tennis player 
Kapros, alternate name of various locations in antiquity; see Caprus (disambiguation)